The Gay Buckaroo is a 1932 American pre-Code Western film, directed by Phil Rosen. It stars Hoot Gibson, Merna Kennedy, and Roy D'Arcy, and was released on January 17, 1932.

Plot
Cowboy Hale and gambler Dumont are both in love with Field. Initially she favors Dumont, but Hale reveals that Dumont is really a criminal, and Hale ends up victorious in romance.

Cast
 Hoot Gibson as Clint Hale
 Merna Kennedy as Mildred Field
 Roy D'Arcy as Dave Dumont
 Edward Peil Sr. as Hi Low Jack
 Charles King as Faro Parker
 Lafe McKee as Sporty Bill Field
 Sydney de Grey as Uncle Abner

References

External links 
 
 
 

Films directed by Phil Rosen
American Western (genre) films
1932 Western (genre) films
1932 films
American black-and-white films
1930s American films
1930s English-language films